Wolf Devil Woman (Mandarin: 狼女白魔, pronounced Lang nu bai mo), also known as Wolfen Ninja, is a 1982 Taiwanese fantasy horror film starring, written, produced and directed by Pearl Chang.

The English-dubbed version of the film is notable for its bizarre vocal performances, particularly the vocal performance for the film's antagonist, "The Devil", who speaks like American cartoon character Yosemite Sam.

The film was followed by a 1983 sequel, Wolf Devil Woman 2, which also starred and was directed by Pearl Chang.

Plot 
A young girl is taken from the devil's region followers and raised in the wilderness of Cold Ice Peak. The girl is raised by the legendary White Wolf of a Thousand Years. "Legend of Cold Ice Peak" is the story of the wolf/woman that grows up in the snowy wilderness of the Cold Ice Peak, her mysterious traits of monster and animal that become folklore.

Cast
Pearl Chang
Shih Feng
Shih Ying
Wang Hsieh
Pa Ke
Yi Hsiao-man
Chang Yu-hsiang
Yeh Chao-hsu
Wang Pei-yi
He Hsing-nan
Hu Chung
Su Yuen-feng

See also
Story of the White-Haired Demon Girl
White Hair Devil Lady
The Bride with White Hair
The Bride with White Hair 2
The Romance of the White Hair Maiden (1986 TV series)
The Romance of the White Hair Maiden (1995 TV series)
Romance of the White Haired Maiden (1999 TV series)

External links

HKMDB

1982 films
Taiwanese horror films
1982 fantasy films
Taiwanese supernatural horror films
Dark fantasy films